The 1947–48 Swedish Division I season was the fourth season of Swedish Division I. Sodertalje SK defeated Hammarby IF in the league final, 2 games to none.

Regular season

Northern Group

Southern Group

Final
Hammarby IF – Södertälje SK 2–6, 1–6

External links
 1947–48 season

Swedish Division I seasons
Swedish
1